Andira humilis is a species of tree native to Brazil.

References

External links
Andira humilis 

Faboideae
Trees of Brazil